Nandasmo Futbol Clube is a Nicaraguan football team currently playing in the Nicaraguan Primera División. They are based in Nandasmo.

History
Nandasmo was promoted to the Primera Division after the 2015–2016 season.   However, they were immediately relegated after finishing dead last in both the Apertura and Clausura.

Current squad

Squad changes 2016 Apertura
In:

Achievements
Segunda División de Nicaragua: 1
2016

List of Coaches
  TBD
  Marcos Bodán (2016)

External links
 Profile – GoolNica

Football clubs in Nicaragua